The 1959–60 Ice hockey Bundesliga season was the second season of the Ice hockey Bundesliga, the top level of ice hockey in Germany. Eight teams participated in the league, and SC Riessersee won the championship.

Regular season

Relegation

References

Eishockey-Bundesliga seasons
Bund
Ger